center.tv is a German regional TV channel, with customised programmes for Aachen, Cologne and other German cities as well as Singapore. It broadcasts 24/7, providing with information, service, entertainment, culture and sport-oriented formats, including short advertisement breaks to lend an opportunity for smaller local companies to promote themselves. center.tv can be received via a digital or analogue cable connection, and via internet livestream.

Journalistic activity on the part of center.tv is limited to being carried out mainly by video and hobby journalists.

Television stations in Germany
Television networks in Germany
Mass media in Cologne